Rui Miguel Nereu de Branco Batista (born 4 February 1986), known as Nereu, is a Portuguese former footballer who played as a goalkeeper.

Club career
Nereu was born in Alcanena, Santarém District. A product of S.L. Benfica's youth system he made his senior debut on 18 October 2005 during a UEFA Champions League group stage game at Villarreal CF, after an early injury to Quim. Four days later he first appeared in the Primeira Liga, as the same thing happened in a 2–0 home win against C.F. Estrela da Amadora; additionally, he again featured against the Spaniards in the Champions League group phase, playing the full 90 minutes in a 0–1 home loss.

As habitual backup José Moreira was also injured Nereu, who had also played with the club's reserves before their extinction, went on to appear in another two matches. In 2007, he was sold to Académica de Coimbra, backing up veteran Pedro Roma in his first season. However, after the purchase of Slovak Boris Peškovič, he was further demoted to third choice.

From January 2011-June 2012, Nereu represented F.C. Arouca of the second division, playing 14 games in his only full campaign. He subsequently alternated between his country's second and third tiers.

References

External links

National team data 

1986 births
Living people
People from Alcanena
Portuguese footballers
Association football goalkeepers
Primeira Liga players
Liga Portugal 2 players
Segunda Divisão players
S.L. Benfica B players
S.L. Benfica footballers
Associação Académica de Coimbra – O.A.F. players
F.C. Arouca players
SC Mirandela players
S.C. Freamunde players
C.D. Tondela players
Portugal youth international footballers
Sportspeople from Santarém District